Aletes may refer to:

Greek mythology
 Aletes (son of Aegisthus), who was killed by Orestes
 Aletes (Aeneid character), a Trojan counselor depicted in the Aeneid
 Aletes, son of Hippotes, one of the Heracleidae
 Aletes, son of Icarius
 Aletes, another name for Bakis of Arcadia

Biology
 Aletes (plant), a plant genus
 Aletes (gastropod), a marine gastropod genus in the fossil record
 Aletes, a genus of moth and synonym of Pyralis